Charles Montgomery (1924–1995) was an Australian rugby league footballer who played in the 1940s. He was a premiership winning prop-forward with St George and finished his career with Newtown.

Playing career
'Chassa' Montgomery played two seasons with St George Dragons between 1941 and 1942, and played in the front-row in their victorious 1941 Grand Final. He then moved to Newtown, where he played another two seasons between 1944 and 1945. He made another Grand Final appearance at prop-forward in the Newtown side that lost the 1944 Grand Final to Balmain. 

Both sides had been accused of "dogging-it" in the Final where they met, and allowing Balmain to win so that they would need to meet in a Grand Final a week later.

Montgomery went on to Captain coach in Townsville, Queensland in the early 1960s playing well into his 40s.

Post playing
In his later years, Montgomery was a selector for the Townsville Foley shield team in 1974–5. Montgomery died in Townsville, Queensland on 4 Feb 1995, age 71

References

 Haddan, Steve (2007) The Finals - 100 Years of National Rugby League Finals, Steve Haddan Publishing, Brisbane

1924 births
1995 deaths
St. George Dragons players
Newtown Jets players
Australian rugby league administrators
Australian rugby league players
Rugby league players from Sydney
Rugby league props